Dato' Zainal Abidin Ahmad (10 October 1939 – 25 March 2010) was a Malaysian politician. He was the Member of the Parliament of Malaysia for the Hulu Selangor constituency in Selangor until his death in 2010. He was a member of the Parti Keadilan Rakyat (PKR) party in the Pakatan Rakyat opposition coalition.

Zainal Abidin was a member of the State Assembly of Selangor from 1990 for the UMNO party before being omitted from the ticket of the governing Barisan Nasional coalition for the 2004 election. From 1995 to 1999 he served as Deputy Menteri Besar (Chief Minister) and on the Selangor Executive Council.

Zainal Abidin switched to the opposition Keadilan party in 2005. In the 2008 election, Zainal won the federal seat of Hulu Selangor, unseating the incumbent Barisan Nasional member by a narrow margin of 198 votes.

Zainal Abidin died on 25 March 2010 from brain cancer, triggering a by-election in Hulu Selangor which was won by YB P. Kamalanathan of (MIC) – (BN).

Election results

Honours
  :
 Knight Commander of the Order of the Crown of Selangor (DPMS) – Dato' (1993)

References

1939 births
2010 deaths
People from Selangor
Deaths from brain cancer in Malaysia
Malaysian people of Malay descent
Malaysian Muslims
Members of the Dewan Rakyat
Members of the Selangor State Legislative Assembly
Selangor state executive councillors
Former United Malays National Organisation politicians
People's Justice Party (Malaysia) politicians
Knights Commander of the Order of the Crown of Selangor